Bernard G. Gordon (November 16, 1916 – May 4, 1978) was an American lawyer and politician from New York.

Life
He was born on November 16, 1916, in Peekskill, Westchester County, New York, the son of David Gordon (1885–1962) and Rose Gordon (1889–1977). He graduated from Syracuse University and Syracuse University College of Law. During World War II he was a United States naval aviator. He married Leila Sally Mencher, and they had one daughter. He practiced law in Peekskill, and entered politics as a Republican.

Gordon was a Deputy Secretary of State of New York from 1959 to 1960; a member of the New York State Assembly (Westchester Co., 6th D.) from 1961 to 1964, sitting in the 173rd and 174th New York State Legislatures; and a member of the New York State Senate from 1965 until his death in 1978, sitting in the 175th, 176th, 177th, 178th, 179th, 180th, 181st and 182nd New York State Legislatures. In the Senate he was the driving force behind the No-fault automobile insurance law enacted in 1973.

He died on May 4, 1978, at his home in Peekskill, New York, of cancer; and was buried at the First Hebrew Cemetery in Cortlandt Manor.

Sources

External links

1916 births
1978 deaths
People from Peekskill, New York
Republican Party members of the New York State Assembly
Republican Party New York (state) state senators
Syracuse University College of Law alumni
Deaths from cancer in New York (state)
20th-century American politicians
United States Navy personnel of World War II